The Sea Tiger is a 1927 American silent drama film produced and distributed by First National Pictures and directed by John Francis Dillon. The film stars Milton Sills and Mary Astor. It is now a lost film.

The film is also known under the title of its source material, The Runaway Enchantress.

Cast
Milton Sills as Justin Ramos
Mary Astor as Amy Cortissos
Larry Kent as Charles Ramos
Alice White as Manuella
Kate Price as Bridget
Arthur Stone as Enos
Emily Fitzroy as Mrs. Enos
Joe Bonomo as Sebastiano

References

External links

1927 films
American silent feature films
Films directed by John Francis Dillon
Lost American films
1927 drama films
Silent American drama films
First National Pictures films
American black-and-white films
1927 lost films
Lost drama films
1920s American films